Pauline Gibling Schindler (March 19, 1893 – May 4, 1977) was an American composer, educator, editor, and arts promoter, especially influential in supporting modern art in Southern California.  Her husband was architect Rudolph Schindler.

Early life and education

Sophie Pauline Gibling was born in Minneapolis in 1893, the daughter of Edmund James and Sophie Schlarbaum Gibling.  Her father was English-born. Pauline Gibling was raised in the New York City area, and attended Columbia High School in Maplewood, New Jersey, where she was classmates with Alfred Kinsey. She studied music at Smith College, in the class of 1915.  After graduation she spent two years at Hull House in Chicago.  She married Rudolph Schindler in August 1919; they lived briefly at Taliesin the next year before moving to Los Angeles, where Schindler worked for Frank Lloyd Wright.  Their home, the Schindler House in West Hollywood, was completed in 1922, an experiment in shared living, called "the built evocation of Schindler's collaboration with his wife."

Career
While still in Los Angeles, she taught at the Walt Whitman School in Boyle Heights, and served with Rudolph on the school's board. Through the school, they met Edward Weston, whose sons were students there. The couple hosted social gatherings at Schindler House, with Pauline mainly inviting artists and political thinkers. Pauline wrote an affidavit of support for Richard Neutra's visa into the United States in 1923, and the Neutras later lived at Schindler House for a few years.

After separating from Schindler in 1927, Pauline moved to artists' colonies at Carmel-by-the-Sea, California. She edited a weekly newspaper called The Pine Cone and later another publication, The Carmelite, where she clashed with fellow editor Lincoln Steffens, and at Oceano, where she helped to edit a monthly arts journal, Dune Forum.  She also lived at Halcyon, Santa Fe, and Ojai during these years. She returned to the Schindler House in the late 1930s, and lived there with her ex-husband until he died in 1953, and with others until her death in 1977.  She painted her side of the house pink, added carpeting and updated the plumbing in her later years.

As a musicologist she published as "Sophie P. Gibling."

Personal life
Pauline Gibling and Rudolph Schindler had one son, Mark.  They divorced in 1940. Pauline had a brief relationship with John Cage, who was almost twenty years her junior, in the 1930s.

Legacy
The non-profit Friends of Schindler House was formed by Pauline in 1976, shortly before her death, to maintain the house. It has since become an arts center, and is open for architectural tours.

A musical performance based on Schindler's life, Pauline: An Opera, was presented by architects Frank Escher and Ravi GuneWardena at Schindler House, in October 2013.

References

Other sources

Hines, Thomas (2018).

1893 births
1977 deaths
Columbia High School (New Jersey) alumni
Dunites
People from Maplewood, New Jersey
Smith College alumni
People from Carmel-by-the-Sea, California